Chan Chin-wei (born 8 January 1985) is a former professional tennis player from Taiwan.

She won one doubles title on the WTA Tour, along with six singles and 49 doubles titles on the ITF Women's Circuit. She reached her best singles ranking of world No. 152 in October 2006. On 3 August 2015, she peaked at No. 74 in the WTA doubles rankings.

Career
Chan started tennis at the age of ten. In 2002, she played for Taiwan's Fed Cup team for the first time. Her coach was Chan Fu-chen.

In 2013, she won the doubles competition at the Korea Open in Seoul, her first title on the WTA Tour. She also won three $25k events (in Changwon, Huzhu and Tsukuba) on the ITF Circuit.
In September 2014, Chan won the doubles competition at the Suzhou Ladies Open, her first doubles title on WTA 125 tournaments. In that year, she also won two $50k events (in Quanzhou and Seoul).

In July 2018, she played her last matches on the professional circuit.

WTA career finals

Doubles: 3 (1 title, 2 runner-ups)

WTA 125 tournament finals

Doubles: 4 (1 title, 3 runner-ups)

ITF Circuit finals

Singles: 18 (6–12)

Doubles: 81 (49–32)

References

External links

 
 
 

1985 births
Living people
Taiwanese female tennis players
Sportspeople from Kaohsiung
Asian Games medalists in tennis
Tennis players at the 2002 Asian Games
Tennis players at the 2006 Asian Games
Tennis players at the 2014 Asian Games
Asian Games gold medalists for Chinese Taipei
Asian Games silver medalists for Chinese Taipei
Asian Games bronze medalists for Chinese Taipei
Medalists at the 2002 Asian Games
Medalists at the 2006 Asian Games
Medalists at the 2014 Asian Games
Universiade medalists in tennis
Universiade gold medalists for Chinese Taipei
Universiade bronze medalists for Chinese Taipei
Medalists at the 2003 Summer Universiade
Medalists at the 2005 Summer Universiade
Medalists at the 2007 Summer Universiade
Medalists at the 2011 Summer Universiade
21st-century Taiwanese women